Walter Neusel (November 25, 1907 – October 3, 1964) was a German heavyweight boxer. During his career he held the distinction of being recognized as German Heavyweight Champion. Statistical boxing website BoxRec rates Neusel as the sixth best German boxer ever across all weight divisions.

Professional career 

Neusel turned professional in 1930, racking up a 32–0–2 record before experiencing his first lost against Belgian pugilist Pierre Charles via points decision. During this period, Neusel scored wins over top European heavyweight contenders Gipsy Daniels (twice) and Larry Gains. In 1933, Neusel followed his contemporary Max Schmeling to America, where he became popular due to his aggressive style. In 1934, he defeated King Levinsky and the future Hall of Famer Tommy Loughran. These accomplishments earned him a ranking as one of the Ring Magazine's Top 10 heavyweights, setting up a bout with Schmeling for European supremacy.

First bout with Schmeling 

On August 26, 1934 in Hamburg came a very important match for European boxing, Neusel against Schmeling. The venue was the dirt track facility in the immediate vicinity of Hagenbeck Zoo, which boxing promoter Walter Rothenburg had rebuilt within a few weeks in a rushed manner. Though the audience figures vary from 90,000–102,000 it was unquestionably the largest number of spectators in German history. Neusel lost the match via ninth round technical knockout, putting up a valiant effort but ultimately being outclassed by Schmeling.

European contender 

After the Schmeling fight, Neusel held another future Hall of Famer in Len Harvey to a 12 round draw. Following up with back-to-back victories over Welsh contender Jack Petersen. In 1935, Neusel returned to America to face former Heavyweight World Title holder Primo Carnera; losing the bout via fourth round knockout. He then returned to Europe and beat South African challenger Ben Foord twice, with both wins sandwiched around a loss to Tommy Farr.

World War II era & later career 

In 1940, Neusel won the German Heavyweight title against Arno Kölblin in Berlin. He lost the title to Heinz Lazek in the latter part of 1940, but regained it against Adolf Heuser in 1942. He lost it for the last time against Hein ten Hoff in 1946. In 1948, Neusel had a rematch with arch-rival Schmeling, 14 years after the initial encounter. This time Neusel prevailed with a points decision victory over 12 rounds.

Notable bouts 
  
| style="text-align:center;" colspan="7"|
|-  style="text-align:center; background:#e3e3e3;"
|  style="border-style:none none solid solid; "|Result
|  style="border-style:none none solid solid; "|Opponent
|  style="border-style:none none solid solid; "|Type
|  style="border-style:none none solid solid; "|Rd., Time
|  style="border-style:none none solid solid; "|Date
|  style="border-style:none none solid solid; "|Location
|  style="border-style:none none solid solid; "|Notes
|- align=center
|Loss
|align=left| 
|
|
|
|align=left|
|- align=center
|style="background:#abcdef;"|Draw
|align=left| Hein ten Hoff
|
|
|
|align=left|
|align=left|
|- align=center
|Win
|align=left| Max Schmeling
|
|
|
|align=left|
|align=left|
|- align=center
|Loss
|align=left| Hein ten Hoff 
|
|
|
|align=left|
|align=left|
|- align=center
|Loss
|align=left| Hein ten Hoff 
|
|
|
|align=left|
|align=left|
|- align=center
|Win
|align=left| Adolf Heuser
|
|
|
|align=left|
|align=left|
|- align=center
|style="background:#abcdef;"|Draw
|align=left| Adolf Heuser
|
|
|
|align=left|
|align=left|
|- align=center
|Loss
|align=left| Heinz Lazek 
|
|
|
|align=left|
|align=left|
|- align=center
|Win
|align=left| Arno Kölblin
|
|
|
|align=left|
|align=left|
|- align=center
|Win
|align=left| Adolf Heuser
|
|
|
|align=left|
|align=left|
|- align=center
|Loss
|align=left| Heinz Lazek
|
|
|
|align=left|
|align=left|
|- align=center
|Win
|align=left| Arno Kölblin
|
|
|
|align=left|
|align=left|
|- align=center
|Win
|align=left| Arno Kölblin
|
|
|
|align=left|
|align=left|
|- align=center
|Loss
|align=left| Heinz Lazek 
|
|
|
|align=left|
|align=left|
|- align=center
|Win
|align=left| Heinz Lazek 
|
|
|
|align=left|
|align=left|
|- align=center
|Win
|align=left| Ben Foord
|
|
|
|align=left|
|align=left|
|- align=center
|Loss
|align=left| Tommy Farr
|
|
|
|align=left|
|align=left|
|- align=center
|Win
|align=left| Jack Petersen
|
|
|
|align=left|
|align=left|
|- align=center
|Win
|align=left| Ben Foord
|
|
|
|align=left|
|align=left|
|- align=center
|Loss
|align=left| Primo Carnera
|
|
|
|align=left|
|align=left|
|- align=center
|Win
|align=left| Jack Petersen
|
|
|
|align=left|
|align=left|
|- align=center
|Win
|align=left| Jack Petersen
|
|
|
|align=left|
|align=left|
|- align=center
|style="background:#abcdef;"|Draw
|align=left| Len Harvey
|
|
|
|align=left|
|align=left|
|- align=center
|Loss
|align=left| Max Schmeling
|
|
|
|align=left|
|align=left|
|- align=center
|Win
|align=left| Tommy Loughran
|
|
|
|align=left|
|align=left|
|- align=center
|Win
|align=left| King Levinsky
|
|
|
|align=left|
|align=left|
|- align=center
|Win
|align=left| Gipsy Daniels
|
|
|
|align=left|
|align=left|
|- align=center
|Win
|align=left| Larry Gains
|
|
|
|align=left|
|align=left|
|- align=center
|Win
|align=left| Gipsy Daniels
|
|
|
|align=left|
|align=left|

References

Bibliography

External links

|-

1907 births
1964 deaths
Sportspeople from Bochum
Heavyweight boxers
German male boxers